Chlorflurazole is an herbicide. It is classified as an extremely hazardous substance in the United States as defined in Section 302 of the U.S. Emergency Planning and Community Right-to-Know Act (42 U.S.C. 11002), and is subject to strict reporting requirements by facilities which produce, store, or use it in significant quantities.

References

Herbicides
Chloroarenes
Benzimidazoles
Trifluoromethyl compounds